is an anime created by Tatsunoko Productions.

Plot

Temple is a lovely little girl who is more fond of music than anything else. She happens to board a balloon one day, and is excited by her journey until she is caught in a sudden storm and is blown away from her parents and home. She is in tears until she meets a drummer boy named Tam-Tam accompanied by animal friends who also play musical instruments. Joined by these new friends who play music to keep up her spirits, Temple sets out to find her way home and she finds love with the drummer boy.

One of the final works credited to Tatsunoko Production co-founder Tatsuo Yoshida, who died in September 1977 shortly before the TV series premiered, it is widely believed that the curly-haired heroine of this series was named after Shirley Temple (indeed, Temple was renamed to Shirley in the French dub).  The series was a success throughout Europe and Latin America in the 1980s under several differing titles, including Temple e Tam Tam (Italian), Shirley la petite fille en ballon (French), and Sabrina y sus amigos (Spanish).  Harmony Gold attempted to produce an English dub to sell to the American market under at least two different titles - Sabrina's Journey and Tiffany's Traveling Band - but Temple the Balloonist has never been released in English.

Characters 

 Temple Farmer (Sabrina in Latin Spanish)(voiced by Kumiko Takizawa) is an adorable little girl who loves music and dance, wears a red majorette's outfit and loves to twirl her baton.  While taking a balloon ride with Fuwatto, she is whisked far away from home by a sudden storm and tries to find her way home, accompanied by her traveling band.  She comes from a wealthy family and is somewhat spoiled and indulged by her parents, but matures as her journey continues.
 Tomtom (Tamborin in Latin Spanish) (voiced by Noriko Tsukase) is a drummer boy who was working for an abusive boss in a traveling musical troupe, but manages to escape with Temple's help.  He becomes Temple's companion on her journey and, by the end of the story, something of a love interest.
 Dora (voiced by Kenichi Ogata) is a "doraneko" ("stray cat") who plays his whiskers like a string instrument.
 Gappe (voiced by Kaneta Kimotsuki) is a duck who plays his beak like a trumpet.
 Chuppi (voiced by Yoko Yano) is a mouse and the flautist of Temple's traveling musical troupe.
 Fuwatto (Nimbo) (voiced by Yuko Hisamatsu) is a cloud boy who can modify his body into shapes resembling various musical instruments, including horns and cymbals.
 Jimmy Farmer (voiced by Ryuji Nakagi) is Temple's father.
 Marie Farmer (voiced by Keiko Tomochika) is Temple's mother.
 Boss (voiced by Masao Imanishi) is Tomtom's abusive boss, from whom he escapes in episode one.  He re-appears in episode nine, but Tam-Tam manages to escape from him again.  He has two unnamed henchmen (voiced by Ryuji Nakagi and Masanobu Okubo).
 The Narrator is Ikuko Tani.

Episodes

References

External links
 

1977 anime television series debuts
Comedy anime and manga
Fuji TV original programming
Tatsunoko Production
Animated television series about children
Animated television series about cats
Animated television series about mice and rats
Animated television series about ducks